Black Fox: The Rise and Fall of Adolf Hitler is a 1962 documentary directed by Louis Clyde Stoumen, depicting the rise and fall of Nazi Germany, using Johann Wolfgang von Goethe's 1794 version of Reynard the Fox as a parallel.

It won the Academy Award for Best Documentary Feature in 1962. Black Fox was originally scheduled to be released by Astor Pictures. After Astor's bankruptcy, Black Fox was released by the newly-formed Capri Films.

See also
 List of American films of 1962

References

External links
 

1962 films
Black-and-white documentary films
American documentary films
Best Documentary Feature Academy Award winners
Documentary films about Adolf Hitler
Films based on works by Johann Wolfgang von Goethe
Films directed by Louis Clyde Stoumen
1962 documentary films
American black-and-white films
1960s English-language films
1960s American films